Julia Görges and Lucie Hradecká were the defending champions, but chose not to participate this year.

Sania Mirza and Monica Niculescu and won the title, defeating Kateryna Bondarenko and Chuang Chia-jung in the final, 7–5, 6–4

Seeds

Draw

References
Main Draw

Connecticut Open - Doubles
Doubles